is a former Japanese football player.

Club statistics

References

External links

Profile at Oita Trinita 

1991 births
Living people
Association football people from Tottori Prefecture
Japanese footballers
J1 League players
J2 League players
J3 League players
Japan Football League players
Oita Trinita players
Gainare Tottori players
Iwate Grulla Morioka players
Association football forwards
People from Yonago, Tottori